Daniel O Kelly (born Daniel Kelly; 1974), known as Dan Kelly, is an Australian singer-songwriter and guitarist. He has released music as part of Dan Kelly and the Alpha Males.

Biography

1974–1999: Early Years
Dan Kelly grew up in Queensland, on the Gold Coast, attended a Catholic school, in Beenleigh, and was the second oldest of six children. He learnt the guitar at thirteen and later studied Environmental Science at Griffith University in Brisbane. He formed his first band, Nord, in Brisbane before moving to Melbourne in 1996. 

Kelly reflected saying "I moved down to St Kilda in '96 and lived with my uncle [Paul Kelly] and aunt and worked as a dishwasher for years. Then I was the kitchen-hand and after that I worked as a cook. I was making my way up through that world, just meeting people and trying to play in bands, and by the end of that period, probably around  2000, I had made enough friends and played in enough bands that I built a little bit of confidence to write my own songs."

2000–2003: First solo recordings & Man O Mercy
In 2000 he started playing solo shows under the name Dank Alley, not wanting to trade on his famous uncle Paul Kelly's name. 
In 2002 he released his first solo EP, Man O Mercy, which spawned the radio hit "Countermeal Kim".

2004–2007: Dan Kelly and the Alpha Males 
In 2004 he formed a new band, Dan Kelly and the Alpha Males, comprising Kelly with Gareth Liddiard & Christian Strybosch (The Drones) and Tom Carlyon (The Devastations). They were best known for Kelly's Australian slacker-esque guitar sounds, his falsetto vocals and vivid lyrics. The Alpha Males appeared at The Falls Festival in Melbourne and Tasmania and selected Big Day Outs. In March 2004 they released their debut album, Sing the Tabloid Blues, on In-Fidelity Recordings. 

At the ARIA Music Awards of 2004, Kelly was nominated for ARIA Award for Best Male Artist, with the band receiving two ARIA nominations: for 
Best Adult Contemporary Album and for Breakthrough Artist-Album. 

Kelly said "The songs were basically taken from jokes said around the kitchen table and they all referenced my flatmates. We were slightly mad back then. The songs are still pretty gag-heavy but we didn't want the album to be a joke. I didn't want to be a joke writer, a comedy writer, that's a whole different world – I didn't want to hang out with comedians the rest of my life." He performed in his uncle's band, Paul Kelly and the Boon Companions, recording on the 2004 album, Ways & Means.

In 2005, Liddiard and Carlyon travelled to Europe with their respective other projects, with Aaron Cupples, Dan Luscombe and Lewis Boyes joining the Alpha Males. The band then released an EP, Pirate Radio, in October 2005, which saw Kelly receive his second nomination for ARIA Award for Best Male Artist at the ARIA Music Awards of 2006. 

The band gained significant press coverage in mid-2006 with their single "Drunk on Election Night" – a reflection on the disillusionment many experienced during the evening of the 2004 Australian federal election. The song was hand picked by Neil Young to be included in his Living With War Songs of The Times.

Their second album, Drowning in the Fountain of Youth, released in August 2006, was awarded Album of the Year by Melbourne-based music magazine Inpress. Kelly received his third nomination for ARIA Award for Best Male Artist at the ARIA Music Awards of 2007. The album was also short-listed for the 2006 J Award. 

In early 2007, Kelly announced his backing band, the Alpha Males, were to disband for an undecided amount of time to allow the individual members to focus on other projects, a pertinent example being the addition of Dan Luscombe to the line up of The Drones. Kelly again joined his uncle, performing on his 2007 album, Stolen Apples and subsequent national tour, and has often returned to his touring band since.

2008: Dan Kelly and the Ukeladies 
In 2008 Kelly teamed up with Melbourne faux Hawaiian duo, The Ukeladies, to release "The S.U.V Song", undertaking a number of headline shows and support shows with Augie March, in October and November 2008.

2009–2014 : Dan Kelly's Dream Band 
In late 2009 Kelly commenced work on a new album, Dan Kelly's Dream. The first single, "Bindi Irwin Apocalypse Jam", was released in April 2010. Kelly undertook a national tour with a new line up called Dan Kelly's Dream Band comprising Dave Williams & Kiernan Box (Augie March), Indra Adams (Ground Components) and Ryan Nelson (SubAudible Hum).  Dallas Packard (Ground Components) and Kelly's teenage cousins Madeleine and Memphis Kelly (daughters of Paul Kelly) also featured on the album, with the girls frequently joining the touring band on stage to provide backing vocals.

Dan Kelly’s Dream made a number of best album of the year lists, notably Faster Louder, Mess and Noise and The Age. At the EG Awards of 2010, Kelly won the award for Best Male artist and was nominated for Best Male Artist at the ARIA Music Awards of 2010. Dan Kelly’s Dream was nominated for the 2010 AMP award for best Australian album.

2015–present: Leisure Panic! 
In October 2015, Kelly released Leisure Panic! on ABC Music. The album was recorded over two years in East London, Northern New South Wales, Melbourne and Sydney with members of the Dream Band and long time collaborator Aaron Cupples. The album spawned the singles "Never Stop the Rot" and "Everything's Amazing". It was met with critical acclaim culminating in its nomination for the 2015 AMP award for best Australian album.

In 2016, Kelly embarked on the 'Australian Dreamers' national tour with Alex Gow (Oh Mercy), with both artists taking the stage together.

In 2019, Kelly celebrated 15 years of Sing the Tabloid Blues by performing the album in Australia.

Discography

Albums

Extended plays

Singles

Awards

AIR Awards
The Australian Independent Record Awards (commonly known informally as AIR Awards) is an annual awards night to recognise, promote and celebrate the success of Australia's Independent Music sector. They commenced in 2006.

|-
| rowspan="2" | AIR Awards of 2010
| himself
| Best Independent Artist
| 
|-
| Dan Kelly's Dream 
| Best Independent Album
| 
|-

ARIA Music Awards
The ARIA Music Awards is an annual awards ceremony that recognises excellence, innovation, and achievement across all genres of Australian music. Kelly has been nominated for six awards.

|-
| rowspan="3" | 2004
| rowspan="3" | Sing The Tabloid Blues
| Best Male Artist
| 
|-
| Breakthrough Artist - Album
| 
|-
| Best Independent Release
| 
|-
| 2006
| Pirate Radio
| Best Male Artist
| 
|-
| 2007
| Drowning in the Fountain of Youth
| Best Male Artist
| 
|-
| 2010
| Dan Kelly's Dream
| Best Male Artist
| 
|-

Australian Music Prize
The Australian Music Prize (the AMP) is an annual award of $30,000 given to an Australian band or solo artist in recognition of the merit of an album released during the year of award. It commenced in 2005.

|-
| 2010
| Dan Kelly's Dream
| Australian Music Prize
| 
|-
| 2015
| Leisure
| Australian Music Prize
| 
|-

EG Awards / Music Victoria Awards
The EG Awards (known as Music Victoria Awards since 2013) are an annual awards night celebrating Victorian music. They commenced in 2006.

|-
| EG Awards of 2010
| himself
| Best Male Artist
| 
|-

J Award
The J Awards are an annual series of Australian music awards that were established by the Australian Broadcasting Corporation's youth-focused radio station Triple J. They commenced in 2005.

|-
| J Award of 2006
|Drowning in the Fountain of Youth
| Australian Album of the Year
|

References

External links 
 Official site
 Neil Young Living With War Songs of the Times
 The Harbour Agency – artist roster
 In-Fidelity Records – Dan Kelly discography

Living people
Paul Kelly (Australian musician)
Place of birth missing (living people)
Australian people of Italian descent
Australian people of Irish descent
1974 births
Stardust Five members